The Boulogne camp may designate two military camps around Boulogne-sur-Mer in France.

First camp 
The first camp was prepared by Julius Caesar in 54 BC to prepare the fleet for his second expedition to Britain. 
One hypothesis is that Julius Caesar set up his camp at the current location of the old City of Boulogne-sur-Mer.  Some historians believe that the Old City was built on the camp; at a vicinity to Itius port which he cites in Chapter IV of its Gallic Wars:  
 Caesar returns in Hither Gaul, and from there to the army. When he got there, he visited all neighborhoods, and finds that the singular activity of the soldiers had managed, despite extreme shortages of all things, to build about six hundred ships of the form described above and twenty eight galleys, all ready for sea in a few days. After giving praise to soldiers and those who had led the work, he instructs his intentions and ordered them to go all the Itius port, where he knew the ride in Brittany is very convenient, the distance this island to the mainland being only thirty thousand steps.

Second camp 

The second camp was established by  Bonaparte (Napoleon 1st) in 1803, and continued by Napoleon until 1805. This was where he assembled the "Grand Army", or Army of the ocean, to invade Britain. 

On May 16, 1803, the British, without previous declaration of war, seized  a hundred French and Batavian ships. France declared war on England then.  Bonaparte then chose Boulogne-sur-Mer as a base for attacks against England. 

The Boulogne camp housed about 60,000 soldiers in 1805, it was divided into two large camps   : 
 one was on the left bank of the Liana, near d'Outreau,    
 the other was in the area of Vallon Terlincthun and the plateau of the tour d'Order. 
At the top of the cliff were the command barracks, including that of Napoleon, but the headquarters was located at Castle of Pont-de-Briques.

Notes & references

Related article  
 Camp de Montreuil

Bibliography  
 Fernand Nicolaÿ, Napoléon Ier au camp de Boulogne, Paris, Perrin et cie, 1907. 
 Albert Chatelle, Napoléon et la Légion d'honneur au camp de Boulogne, 1801-1805, Paris, Lajeunesse, 1956. 
 Daniel Haigneré et Augustus Henry Pitt-Rivers, Étude sur le Portus Itius de Jules César : réfutation d'un mémoire de F. de Saulcy, Paris, Renouard, 1862.

External links  
Synthetic note on the first distribution of the Legion of Honor at the Boulogne Camp August 16, 1804

Boulogne-sur-Mer
Military locations